Berchtold may refer to:

 Berchtold, given name
 Berchtold (surname)